The 50th Illinois General Assembly met from 1917 to 1919. John G. Oglesby of Decatur was the Lieutenant Governor of Illinois and thus ex officio President of the Senate. Adam C. Cliffe of Sycamore was President pro tempore of the Senate. David Shanahan of Chicago was the Speaker of the House of Representatives.

There were 33 Republicans and 18 Democrsts in the Illinois Senate and 85 Republicans 67 Democrats and 1 independent in the Illinois House of Representatives.

Districts
Illinois was divided into 51 districts, each of which elected one Senator and three Representatives. Districts were last reapportioned in 1901 and would not be reapportioned again until 1947.

The counties of each district were as follows:
1st, 2nd, 3rd, 4th, 5th, 6th, 7th, 9th, 11th, 13th, 15th, 17th, 19th, 21st, 23rd, 25th, 27th, 29th, and 31st: Parts of Cook
8th: Lake, McHenry, and Boone
10th: Ogle and Winnebago
12th: Stephenson, Jo Daviess, and Carroll
14th: Kane and Kendall
16th: Marshall, Putnam, Livingston, and Woodford
18th: Peoria
20th: Grundy, Kankakee, and Iroquois
22nd: Vermillion and Edgar
24th: Champaign, Piatt, and Moultrie
26th: Ford and McLean
28th: DeWitt, Logan, and Macon
30th: Tazewell, Mason, Menard, Cass, Schuyler, and Brown
32nd: Hancock, McDonough, and Warren
33rd: Henderson, Mercer, and Rock Island
34th: Douglas, Coles, and Clark
35th: Whiteside, Lee, and DeKalb
36th: Adams, Pike, Calhoun, and Scott
37th: Henry, Stark, and Bureau
38th: Greene, Jersey, Macoupin, and Montgomery
39th: LaSalle
40th: Christian, Shelby, Cumberland, and Fayette
41st: DuPage and Will
42nd: Clinton, Marion, Clay, and Effingham
43rd: Knox and Fulton
44th: Jackson, Perry, Washington, Randolph, and Monroe
45th: Morgan and Sangamon
46th: Jefferson, Wayne, Richland, and Jasper
47th: Madison and Bond
48th: Hardin, Gallatin, White, Edwards, Wabash, Lawrence, and Crawford
49th: St. Clair
50th: Hamilton, Saline, Pope, Johnson, and Massac
51st: Franklin, Williamson, Union, Pulaski, and Alexander

See also
List of Illinois state legislatures

Notes

References

Bibliography

1917 in Illinois
1918 in Illinois
Illinois
Illinois
50